Crematogaster censor is a species of ant in tribe Crematogastrini. It was described by Forel in 1910.

References

censor
Insects described in 1910